Akasik Mountain is a mountain in the Lillooet Ranges of British Columbia, Canada, located southwest of the town of Lytton.

The mountain is associated in the lore of the Nlaka'pamux people with Skihist Mountain, whose name means "jump" or "leap" and is a reference to a mythological giant who leapt back and forth between Skihist and this summit.

References

Fraser Canyon
Lillooet Ranges
Two-thousanders of British Columbia
Kamloops Division Yale Land District